The Ducati 60  of 1949-50 was Ducati's first in a 19 model year run of four-stroke, OHV single cylinder motorcycles that ended with the 125 Cadet/4 of 1967. The 60 used the 60 cc pullrod engine of the Cucciolo T3 moped, and a frame supplied by Caproni.  The 60 Sport (actually 65 cc) of 1950-52 used Ducati's own frame, making it their first complete motorcycle.  For 1953 the name was changed to 65 Sport.  They were followed by the  65T, 65TL, 65TS series.

References

See also
List of motorcycles of the 1940s

60
Standard motorcycles
Motorcycles introduced in the 1940s
Single-cylinder motorcycles